Leah Edelstein-Keshet is an Israeli-Canadian mathematical biologist.

Edelstein-Keshet is known for her contributions to the field of mathematical biology and biophysics. Her research spans many topics including sub-cellular biology, ecology, and biomedical research, with particular focus on cell motility and the cytoskeleton, modeling of  physiology and diseases, such as autoimmune diabetes, and swarming and aggregation behavior in social organisms.

She is a full-time professor at the University of British Columbia in Vancouver, Canada.

Early life and education 
Dr. Edelstein-Keshet was born in Israel, and moved to Canada with her parents when she was 12. She earned her Bachelor of Science and Master of Science in Mathematics from Dalhousie University and received in 1982 her doctorate in Applied Mathematics from the Weizmann Institute of Science in Israel.

Career 
Dr. Edelstein-Keshet held teaching positions at Brown University and Duke University before joining the University of British Columbia as Associate Professor in 1989, where she is now Associate Head (Faculty Affairs). She has authored three books, including Mathematical Models in Biology in the SIAM Series Classics in Applied Mathematics. In 1995 she became the first female president of the Society for Mathematical Biology.

Awards and recognition 
In 2003 she was awarded the Krieger–Nelson Prize of the Canadian Mathematical Society. She became a Fellow of the Society for Industrial and Applied Mathematics in 2014 "for contributions to the mathematics and modeling of the cell, the immune system, and biological swarms, as well as to applied mathematics education". She was also awarded a Faculty of Science Award for Leadership from the University of British Columbia. She is the 2022 SIAM John von Neumann Prize Lecturer.

See also
 Timeline of women in science

References

External links
Leah Edelstein-Keshet at UBC

Canadian mathematicians
Theoretical biologists
Canadian women mathematicians
20th-century Canadian biologists
Canadian women academics
Academic staff of the University of British Columbia
Living people
Canadian women biologists
Israeli emigrants to Canada
Israeli mathematicians
Israeli biologists
Israeli women scientists
Israeli Jews
Jewish Canadian scientists
Fellows of the Society for Industrial and Applied Mathematics
Year of birth missing (living people)
21st-century Canadian biologists
20th-century Canadian women scientists
21st-century Canadian women scientists